

Season summary
St Pauli was relegated from the Bundesliga after one season.

First-team squad

Left club during season

References

Notes

FC St. Pauli seasons
St. Pauli